Lord Campbell may refer to:

 Lord Campbell, Lordship of Parliament created in 1445, a subsidiary title of the Duke of Argyll
 Lord John Campbell (1779–1861), Baron Campbell, Lord High Chancellor of Great Britain and Lord High Chancellor of Ireland, and author of Lives of the Lord Chancellors
 Lord Colin Campbell (1853–1895)
 Lord Frederick Campbell (1729–1816)
 Lord Neill Campbell (c. 1630–1692)
 Jock Campbell, Baron Campbell of Eskan (1912–1994), British businessman
 Lord William Campbell (1731–1778), Governor of South Carolina
 Alan Campbell, Baron Campbell of Alloway (1917–2013)
 Duncan Campbell, 1st Lord Campbell (died 1453)
 Lord Campbell of Loudoun
 Menzies Campbell (born 1941), Baron Campbell of Pittenweem, former leader of the Liberal Democrats
 Gordon Campbell, Baron Campbell of Croy (1921–2005)
 Lord Dale Campbell-Savours (born 1943)